Atley Peterson (February 21, 1847 – March 29, 1909) was a Wisconsin pioneer who served as a state legislator, and state railroad commissioner.

Background
Atley P. Peterson was born near the small village of Erdal at  Lærdal parish in Sogn og Fjordane,  Norway. He was the son of Niels  Pederson and Marie Olsdatter (Helland) Pederson. He came to America with his family in 1852. The family moved to Crawford County, Wisconsin in 1854, settling in the Pine Knob area near Soldiers Grove.  Mr. Peterson attended local schools and the Madison, Wisconsin  Business College before going into business in Soldiers Grove at the age of 19.
 He died of edema at his home in Soldiers Grove on March 29, 1909.

Business career
In 1869, Peterson established the village's first post office in the Village of Soldiers Grove, Wisconsin.  He later built a small building on the property to house a small store. In addition to being a sawmill and lumberyard owner, store owner, and part owner of the village's grist mill, Peterson's business career also included being a bank president and farmer. He was co-owner of the electric light plant, which enabled Soldiers Grove to be the first village in the Kickapoo Valley to have electric lights.

Political career
His political career included a number of years as a member of the Crawford County Board. Peterson served as president or supervisor of the Village of Soldiers Grove almost continuously until his death.  He held the office of postmaster for 17 years, from 1869 to 1886. In 1879 he was elected to the Wisconsin State Assembly as a representative to the Wisconsin State Legislature from Bad Ax (now Vernon County) and Crawford County. He served in the Thirty-second session, 1879, Thirty-third session, 1880, Thirty-fourth session, 1881, Thirty-fifth session, 1882.

In 1886, he was elected to replace Nils P. Haugen as Wisconsin Railroad Commissioner and served in this capacity from 1887 to 1891. He served as Presidential Elector for Wisconsin in 1900. Peterson unsuccessfully ran for the office of Wisconsin State Treasurer in 1890 and again in 1902, in an effort to succeed future Wisconsin Governor, James O. Davidson, to that position. He was served as a delegate to the Republican National Convention in 1908.

References

Other sources
Nelson, Olof Nickolaus  (1900) History of the Scandinavians and successful Scandinavians in the United States (Minneapolis, Minn. : O. N. Nelson & Company)
Ward, W. M. (1964) The First 100 Years - A History of Soldiers Grove

External links
Atley Peterson family photograph (Wisconsin Historical Society)

1847 births
1909 deaths
People from Sogn og Fjordane
People from Soldiers Grove, Wisconsin
American merchants
Businesspeople from Wisconsin
Norwegian emigrants to the United States
Members of the Wisconsin State Assembly
19th-century American politicians
19th-century American businesspeople